The 2007–08 Liga I was the ninety season of Liga I, the top-level football league of Romania. Season began on 27 July 2007 and ended on 7 May 2008. CFR Cluj became champions, winning their first trophy and ending a 17-year-long reign of Bucharest based teams.

CFR Cluj will play in the Champions League group stage, while Steaua București qualified for the Champions League third qualifying round. Rapid București, Dinamo București, Unirea Urziceni and Politehnica Știința Timișoara qualified for the UEFA Cup first round. The highest placed team that has not qualified for the UEFA Cup is allowed the opportunity to compete in the third round of the UEFA Intertoto Cup, provided they have applied to enter the Intertoto Cup in the next season. Vaslui, Oțelul Galați and Gloria Bistrița are the only teams that have applied, with Vaslui securing their participation.

Teams

Venues

Personnel and kits

League table

Positions by round

Results

Top goalscorers

Champion squad

Notes
(1) Delta Tulcea won the first serie of Liga II, but did not apply for the license necessary for playing in Liga I in the 2007–08 season. The highest ranked relegated team in the previous season, namely Ceahlăul Piatra Neamț (15th place in 2006–07 season), will continue in Liga I.
(2) Timișoara change of name following name conflict with FC Politehnica Timișoara.

References

Liga I seasons
Romania
1